Jessenland Township is a township in Sibley County, Minnesota, United States. The population was 481 at the 2000 census.

Jessenland Township was organized in 1858, and was said to be named for Jesse Cameron, a pioneer settler.

Geography

Demographics
As of the census of 2000, there were 481 people, 160 households, and 130 families residing in the township.  The population density was 14.5 people per square mile (5.6/km2).  There were 165 housing units at an average density of 5.0/sq mi (1.9/km2).  The racial makeup of the township was 96.88% White, 0.42% Asian, 0.42% from other races, and 2.29% from two or more races. Hispanic or Latino of any race were 2.29% of the population.

There were 160 households, out of which 36.3% had children under the age of 18 living with them, 75.0% were married couples living together, 1.9% had a female householder with no husband present, and 18.8% were non-families. 13.1% of all households were made up of individuals, and 5.6% had someone living alone who was 65 years of age or older.  The average household size was 3.01 and the average family size was 3.35.

In the township the population was spread out, with 30.1% under the age of 18, 6.2% from 18 to 24, 27.7% from 25 to 44, 26.2% from 45 to 64, and 9.8% who were 65 years of age or older.  The median age was 38 years. For every 100 females, there were 118.6 males.  For every 100 females age 18 and over, there were 118.2 males.

The median income for a household in the township was $55,000, and the median income for a family was $59,107. Males had a median income of $32,115 versus $26,042 for females. The per capita income for the township was $18,758.  About 1.6% of families and 3.9% of the population were below the poverty line, including none of those under age 18 and 9.4% of those age 65 or over.

References

Townships in Sibley County, Minnesota
Townships in Minnesota